Ursula Nemec (married name: Koll; born 9 May 1957 in Vienna) is an Austrian former pair skater. With her brother, Michael Nemec, she represented Austria at the 1976 Winter Olympics, where they placed 10th.

She is the mother of Manuel Koll.

Competitive highlights
(with Nemec)

References

Navigation

1957 births
Living people
Figure skaters from Vienna
Austrian female pair skaters
Olympic figure skaters of Austria
Figure skaters at the 1976 Winter Olympics